Lejarreta is a Basque surname. Notable people with the surname include:

 Iñaki Lejarreta (1983–2012), Spanish mountain biker
 Ismael Lejarreta (born 1953), Spanish racing cyclist
 Marino Lejarreta (born 1957), Spanish road racing cyclist

See also
 Legarreta

Basque-language surnames